The Governor of Poltava Oblast is the head of executive branch for the Poltava Oblast.

The office of Governor is an appointed position, with officeholders being appointed by the President of Ukraine, on recommendation from the Prime Minister of Ukraine, to serve four-year term.

The official residence for the Governor is located in Poltava. Since 24 December 2021 the acting Governor is Dmytro Lunin.

Governors
 Mykola Zaludyak (1992–1994, as the Presidential representative)
 Mykola Zaludyak (1995–1998, as the Governor)
 Oleksandr Kolesnikov (1998–1999)
 Anatoliy Kukoba (1999–2000)
 Yevhen Tomin (2000–2003)
 Oleksandr Udovichenko (2003–2005)
 Stepan Bulba (2005–2006)
 Viktor Inozemtsev (2006, acting) 
 Valeriy Asadchev (2006–2010)
 Oleksandr Udovichenko (2010–2014)
 Viktor Buhaichuk (2014) 
 Oleh Pruhlo (2014, acting)
 Valeriy Holovko (2014–2019)
 Roman Tovsty (2019, acting)
 Oleh Pruhlo (2019, acting)
 Oleh Synyehubov (2019–2021)
 Dmytro Lunin (2021-incumbent, acting)

Notes

References

Sources
 World Statesmen.org

External links
Government of Poltava Oblast  in Ukrainian

 
Poltava Oblast